Stockton University is a public university in Galloway Township, New Jersey. It is part of New Jersey's public system of higher education. It is named for Richard Stockton, one of the New Jersey signers of the U.S. Declaration of Independence. Founded in 1969, Stockton accepted its charter class in 1971. At its opening in 1971, classes were held at the Mayflower Hotel in Atlantic City; the campus in Galloway Township began operating late in 1971. Nearly 10,000 students are enrolled at Stockton and it is accredited by the Middle States Commission on Higher Education.

History
In November 1968, New Jersey approved a $202.5 million (equivalent to $ million in ) capital construction bond issue with an earmarked $15 million (equivalent to $ million in ) designated for the construction of a new state college in Southern New Jersey. In 1969, a  tract was selected for the campus in the heart of the New Jersey Pine Barrens in Galloway Township. The trustees originally named the school "South Jersey State College", but they later renamed it to "Stockton State College", in order to avoid confusion with Rutgers College of South Jersey.

In 1970, as construction began to run behind schedule, the trustees realized they needed an alternative location for the first class in 1971. They selected the historic Mayflower Hotel in Atlantic City as the temporary campus.

Classes began on schedule with the commencement of the first academic year in September 1971. The college took shape as 1,000 students (50 of whom were Educational Opportunity Fund students), 97 staff, and 60 full-time faculty took over the former resort hotel. By December 1971, occupancy of the first phase of the new campus construction took place, with the transfer of classes and offices to Galloway Township during the winter holiday period.

Accreditation of Stockton State College by the Middle States Association of Colleges and Schools was first granted in December 1975. In July 1991, the college was re-accredited unconditionally for another 10 years by the Middle States Association Commission on Higher Education, and Middle States accreditation was reaffirmed most recently in 2012.

In 1978 the US Congress passed legislation creating the New Jersey Pinelands National Reserve, the first such designation in the nation, to protect the area's ecology and aquifer, which serves the large metropolitan region. In 1988, the United Nations designated it an International Biosphere Reserve, in recognition of its importance.

Stockton continued to grow rapidly. Housing II opened in November 1981. With the opening of the N-Wing College Center & Housing III in February 1983, Stockton State College achieved a high student-residency rate among New Jersey state colleges.

In 1993, the college's name was changed to the Richard Stockton College of New Jersey. Rochelle Hendricks, New Jersey Secretary of Higher Education, approved Stockton's petition to become a university on February 13, 2015. On February 18, 2015, Stockton's Board of Trustees voted to change the former college's seal to reflect the new name, Stockton University. The executive committee of the New Jersey Presidents Council, which represents the presidents of the state's public, private and community colleges and universities that receive state aid, had also voted for the change. In February 2015, the college was awarded University status and was officially renamed Stockton University on February 18, 2015.

Presidents

Richard E. Bjork
Richard E. Bjork led the college as it graduated its first classes, expanded programs and achieved accreditation in 1975, the year it completed Phase II of the campus. The next year, the Performing Arts Center, a community and campus resource, opened.

Peter M. Mitchell
Mitchell led during continued growth as enrollment approached 5,000 students. Housing II, residential facilities for students, opened in November 1981 and the N-Wing College Center in February 1983.

Vera King Farris
Vera King Farris established the Holocaust Center in 1990, and the first Master's program in the country for Holocaust & Genocide studies in 1999. She directed the college to adopt sustainable design and practices, and oversaw expansion during the 1990s, including construction of the Arts and Sciences Building, designed by Michael Graves.

Herman Saatkamp
Emphasizing green buildings, Herman Saatkamp directed completion of a campus master plan in 2005 and a major capital program, including construction of the largest building, the Campus Center, opening in 2011. He initiated the 2010 purchase of what is now Stockton Seaview Hotel and Golf Club, established the Lloyd D. Levenson Institute of Gaming, Hospitality & Tourism in the School of Business, and a collaborative agreement in 2011 with the Cornell University School of Hotel Administration to expand opportunities for students at both institutions in hospitality and tourism. Under his leadership, Stockton expanded its geographic reach, opening instructional sites in Cape May County, Ocean County and western Atlantic County, NJ. He led Stockton's first comprehensive fundraising campaign, which exceeded its goals by raising $25.36 million, including gifts that helped transform Stockton's facilities and programs. Saatkamp oversaw Stockton's purchase of the Showboat casino.

On April 22, 2015, Saatkamp announced his resignation, to take effect on or after August 31, 2015. On April 23, Saatkamp received a vote of "no confidence" from a portion of the faculty. On April 28, it was announced that Saatkamp was taking immediate medical leave.

Harvey Kesselman
Harvey Kesselman, a former provost and executive vice president, was named acting president when Dr. Saatkamp announced his intention to resign and subsequently went on medical leave. Kesselman became interim president September 1, 2015, and was named Stockton's fifth president at a December 2015 meeting of the university's board of trustees. Kesselman was inaugurated on September 23, 2016. Under his leadership, Stockton has added new academic programs, such as a doctorate on Organizational Leadership and a Bachelor of Science degree in Exercise Science. He guided a major facilities expansion at the Galloway campus and strengthening the university's roots in Atlantic City, where he and other students took their first classes when Stockton opened in 1971.

Construction of the $33.2 million Unified Science Center 2 and a $15.2 million classroom building were completed in 2018, creating three sections of a new Academic Quad and entrance to the university. Kesselman negotiated a public-private partnership with Atlantic City Development Corp., or AC Devco, for a new campus in Atlantic City with residences for 533 students overlooking the beach and Boardwalk. Stockton Atlantic City also includes an Academic Center for up to 1,800 students, and a parking garage.  All of Stockton's new facilities opened for classes in fall 2018.

Campus 
In the 2010s, the university completed several major building projects and other initiatives. The new Campus Center opened its doors with a ribbon-cutting ceremony on May 7, 2011. The  building was designed as a green, sustainable building which would be an inviting, inclusive, and exciting gathering place for the entire community.

Stockton opened a new $39.5-million Unified Science Center with state-of-the-art equipment in September 2013. The , three-story facility expands Stockton's School of Natural Sciences and Mathematics (NAMS), which graduates over 20 percent of all the math and science majors at New Jersey's public colleges and universities.

Construction of the $33.2 million Unified Science Center 2 and a $15.2 million classroom building were completed in 2018, creating three sections of a new Academic Quad and entrance to the university.

Seaview Resort
In August 2010, as part of its expansion of its tourism and hotel management program in the School of Business, Stockton announced plans to purchase the nearby Seaview Resort & Golf Course. On September 1, 2010, Stockton completed the deal for $20 million. In 2010, Stockton established the Lloyd D. Levenson Institute of Gaming, Hospitality and Tourism (LIGHT), part of the Stockton School of Business in Atlantic City at Stockton's Carnegie Center.

In September 2011, the first students moved into Seaview, which was operated as a hotel by Dolce Hotels and Resorts, an international hospitality organization. The two golf courses were managed by Troon Golf. Students in Stockton's Hospitality and Tourism Management Studies program as well as other students lived there and worked and learned from top professionals in the hospitality and tourism field, which is integral to the Southern New Jersey economy.

Stockton University officially completed the sale of the Stockton Seaview Hotel & Golf Club on July 31, 2018, to KDG Capital LLC of Florida for $21,070,000. The hotel retained the name Seaview Hotel & Golf Club. Dolce Hotels and Resorts by Wyndham will continue to manage the hotel while Troon will continue to operate the two 18-hole golf courses.

Atlantic City campus

The university has built an Atlantic City campus at the Boardwalk and Albany Ave, with student residences overlooking the beach and Boardwalk. Stockton University Atlantic City opened fall 2018 with more than 500 residential students and more than 1,800 students taking courses in the new Academic Center, built on the former site of Atlantic City High School.
The project is a public-private partnership with Atlantic City Development Corp., or AC Devco, a non-profit modeled on New Brunswick Development Corp., which expanded Rutgers' New Brunswick campus. 
The project includes a parking garage topped by new offices for South Jersey Gas, with 879 parking spaces for use by the university, South Jersey Gas and the public; and an academic building that can accommodate up to 1,800 students. The university also owns and operates the nearby Rothenberg Building.

Funding sources for the Atlantic City campus include $50.4 million in bonds from the Atlantic County Improvement Authority from proceeds of almost $70 million in tax credits issued by the New Jersey Economic Development Authority; $17 million from the Casino Reinvestment Development Authority (CRDA); state bond funds for higher education construction; and $18 million from Stockton.

In December 2014, Stockton had purchased the shuttered Showboat Atlantic City hotel and casino for $18 million, with plans to develop a full-service residential campus awarding undergraduate and graduate degrees and other professional training programs. The former resort, dubbed the "Island Campus", would have been converted casino and employee spaces into classrooms, cafeteria space and offices for faculty and staff. Several floors of hotel rooms would be renovated into student housing, while the remaining rooms would be operated as a hotel. The House of Blues would be modified to house the school's performing arts programs.

Soon after, it was publicly disclosed that Trump Entertainment Resorts held a covenant to the property, preventing the site from being used as anything other than a casino. It was through this covenant that Trump Entertainment Resorts prevented Stockton's plans to open an Atlantic City campus on the Showboat property. President Saatkamp came under fire for making the purchase despite knowing about the covenant. The university reached a deal to lease the property from investor Glenn Straub, who planned to purchase the Showboat. Straub later sued the university to prevent Stockton from backing out of the deal. Stockton sold the Showboat property to Bart Blatstein in January 2016.

Academics 
Stockton's academic programs provide opportunities for study in fields including Criminal Justice, Psychology, Environmental Science, Biology, Business, Historical Studies, and Literature. Additionally, courses are offered in emerging fields such as Computational Science, Tourism and Hospitality Management, and Homeland Security. Stockton also offers a Doctor of Physical Therapy program.  The Division of Continuing Studies in the School of Graduate and Continuing Studies provides credit-bearing and non-credit certificate programs, CE approved continuing professional education for health sciences, human services and business professionals, and a growing number and variety of community education offerings.

Stockton's academic programs and faculty have been recognized by such nationally recognized organizations as the Carnegie Foundation for the Advancement of Teaching and Learning, the National Science Foundation, the American Association of State Colleges and Universities, the John Simon Guggenheim Memorial Foundation, the Pulitzer Prize committee, the United States Air Force Academy, and the Fulbright Program.

Student life
Stockton's Division of Student Affairs is organized to provide comprehensive programs and services to more than 8,800 students, including more than 3,000 students who reside in university facilities. These programs and services are intended to enhance campus life and enrich the academic programs of Stockton.

Stockton University is home to more than 130 official student clubs and organizations including a Student Senate. The Office of Student Development oversees all student clubs and organizations.

There are student media organizations, including the Argo, a student-produced newspaper. WLFR 91.7 (Lake Fred Radio) is the FM radio station licensed to Stockton in 1984.SSTV Ch. 14, Stockton Student Television, is Stockton's on-campus television station. Stockpot Literary Magazine is an annual literary publication featuring art, poetry and writing of Stockton students and alumni. The Stockton yearbook (The Path) is an historical record of the academic year.

Greek life

Fraternities
 Alpha Chi Rho
 Alpha Phi Alpha
 Alpha Phi Delta
 Iota Phi Theta
 Kappa Alpha Psi
 Kappa Sigma
 Lambda Sigma Upsilon
 Lambda Theta Phi
 Omega Psi Phi
 Phi Delta Theta
 Sigma Alpha Epsilon
 Sigma Beta Rho
 Sigma Pi
 Tau Delta Phi

Sororities
 Alpha Kappa Alpha
 Chi Upsilon Sigma
 Delta Delta Delta
 Delta Phi Epsilon
 Delta Sigma Theta
 Delta Zeta
 Lambda Theta Alpha
 Mu Sigma Upsilon
 Sigma Delta Tau
 Sigma Gamma Rho
 Sigma Sigma Sigma
 Zeta Phi Beta
 Zeta Tau Alpha

Service fraternities
 Alpha Phi Omega

Housing
Stockton has six housing units on campus. Housing II and III are complexes of traditional three-story residence halls, while Housing I, IV and V are all apartment-style complexes of varying architectural character.
 Founder’s Hall (Housing II and III): Housing II is an 11-building, suite-style complex, housing around 520 students, with 17 residents per floor and 51 per three-story building. Housing III is a five-building complex, housing approximately 300 students with 20 students per floor and 60 per building. The residential halls offer a more traditional university lifestyle for the first-year experience. Originally, all students who choose to live on campus in their first year were required to live in either Housing II or Housing III; however, due to exceptionally large freshmen classes in recent years, some freshmen are assigned to Housing 1 as well.
 The Apartments (Housing I, IV, and V) consist of three multi-building complexes. Housing I is a 255-unit, 1,012-bed, garden apartment complex, which allows four students to live in proximity while being part of a larger court community of 128.
 Housing IV consists of eight buildings, each with eight two-bedroom apartments, with a total 246 beds. Each apartment holds four residents. Every four apartments are separated by an indoor foyer that leads out to the Housing IV recreational university green.
 Housing V, completed in 2008 as part of the capital program, consists of a complex of six buildings with a total of 384 beds. The Housing V suites house four students, with four key-entry bedrooms. These students share a kitchen and living area with their roommates and have access to a larger community recreation room.
 In fall 2018 Stockton opened its Atlantic City Campus. The Atlantic City Campus Residential Complex can accommodate some 530 students. The room styles are one-person studio, two-person private, four-person shared and private, and six-person private; all are apartment style living, with full kitchens. There is also a  fitness center, locker rooms, mail room, lactation room, and two outdoor courtyards, with retail space available along the world famous Boardwalk and on Atlantic Avenue. AC housing offers both 9-month and 12-month housing contract. The number of rooms was increased for the 2020–2021 school year to comply with regulations relating to the COVID-19 pandemic in New Jersey.

The Housing I, IV, & V apartment style complexes all vary in layout, furnishings, sizes, pricing, and student privacy. Rooms in all residences are completely furnished and include beds, desks, bureaus, wastebaskets, lamps, telephones, air conditioning, carpeting, and curtains. Cable TV and telephone service are also provided. Single rooms are open to new students on a limited basis.

Ranking and special recognition 
Stockton University has been ranked in tier 1 among the nation's top public colleges and universities in the 2015 survey of America's Best Colleges, for the seventh year in a row. In the annual survey by U.S. News & World Report, Stockton University is ranked as ninth among public Regional Universities of the North and 41st among private and public Regional Universities of the North.

In the past, Stockton had been classified as a national liberal arts college. U.S. News & World Report revised its categories early in 2007 and classified it among Regional Universities and Public Schools.

U.S. News & World Report also named Stockton as one of the top six Up and Coming Regional Universities in the North as part of its 2014 report.

Stockton was cited as one of the “Best in the Northeast” in 2015 by The Princeton Review and featured in The Princeton Review’s 2014 Guide to Green Colleges.

Military Times, an organization comprising the Army Times, Navy Times, Air Force Times and Marine Corps Times, named Stockton in its “Best for Vets: Colleges 2019” listing, ranking it No. 24 on the list of four-year schools.

In 2019 Stockton was ranked No. 35 in Regional Universities North by U.S. News & World Report. Schools are ranked according to their performance across a set of widely accepted indicators of excellence. Stockton also ranked tie No. 17 in Best Colleges for Veterans and No. 9 in Top Public Schools in the North.

Academic
 In 1999, Stockton offered the first Master of Arts program in the nation in Holocaust and Genocide Studies.
 The Sara and Sam Schoffer Holocaust Resource Center fosters research and education in Holocaust and genocide studies to honor victims and survivors, and to educate present and future generations in understanding racism, anti-Semitism, hatred and oppression.
 The Environmental Studies and Marine Science programs were selected by Peterson Field Guides and the Alliance for Environmental Education (ANJEE) for inclusion in Education for the Earth, a guide for top environmental studies programs.
 More than 850 students are now enrolled in Stockton's 13 graduate-degree programs, which include a doctorate in Physical Therapy.
 A 2012 report by an evaluation team for the Middle States Commission on Higher Education Middle States noted that "Stockton has attracted a highly qualified, committed faculty who express strong commitment to teaching and precepting as well as increasing their productivity in research, publications, and creative activity".

Architecture
 The original linear campus was cited as one of New Jersey's ten "architectural treasures" by New Jersey Monthly (April 1999) for its International modernist style, designed in the late 1960s by Robert Geddes of Geddes Brecher Qualls Cunningham Architects. Generous use of glass opens views to the Pinelands setting. The noted architect Michael Graves designed the Arts and Sciences Building (1991–1996) in a Post-Modernist style, with organic colors.
 After the F-Wing renovation in 2006, Stockton received LEED certification from the U.S. Green Building Council.
 In 2008, Stockton received the "Green Project of Distinction" award from Education Design Showcase for Housing V (six residence halls).
 The Campus Center was awarded LEED® Gold certification established by the U.S. Green Building Council. Leadership in Energy and Environmental Design (LEED) is the nation's preeminent program for the design, construction and operation of high performance green buildings.
 The Unified Science Center, a 66,350-square-foot facility that opened in 2013, includes energy-efficient features and three striking artworks tied to the building's environmental and scientific purpose: a Water Molecule sculpture by artist Larry Kirkland; The Wave, a hanging colored-glass installation by artist Ray King; and Sun Sails, a second colored-glass installation by King.
 Ground was broken in 2014 for a 54,000-square-foot expansion, The Unified Science Center 2 and a Health Sciences Center, which opened in 2018.

Green initiatives 
Stockton is an environmentally friendly campus featuring a geothermal heat pump, fuel cells, and photovoltaic panels. In 2002, Stockton installed a 200 kW fuel cell at an initial cost of $1.3 million. The New Jersey Board of Public Utilities provided a grant to cover most of the cost of the unit, with Stockton paying only $305,000. South Jersey Industries (SJI) also provided a rebate of $710,000 for the unit. The fuel cell provides just under 10% of the total energy for the campus; Stockton has the lowest energy cost per student among universities in New Jersey.

Stockton achieved national LEED certification for its new sustainable design. In 2006, the F-Wing expansion, including classrooms, offices and an atrium received the prestigious LEED (Leadership in Energy and Environmental Design) Certification from the U.S. Green Building Council.

Stockton's commitment to environmentally responsible design has resulted in "green" initiatives that have both saved energy and decreased greenhouse gas emissions. These include the development on campus of one of the largest geothermal heating and cooling systems in the world. The geothermal systems incorporate seasonal thermal energy storage so that waste heat or winter cold can be collected when seasonally available and stored for use in the opposing seasons. A borehole thermal energy storage system (BTES) was installed in 1994 and is used for heating the older half of campus, with waste heat collected from air conditioning equipment there. In 1995 a fuel cell and photovoltaic panels were installed buildings to generate energy.

An aquifer thermal energy storage system (ATES), the first of its kind in the United States, began operation in 2008. The ATES system reduces the amount of energy used to cool Stockton's newer buildings by storing the chill of winter air in the water and rock of an underground aquifer, and withdrawing it in the summer for cooling. (Because building insulation standards have changed over time, the older buildings have a higher heating than cooling need, and the opposite is true for the newer buildings.)

In 2008, Stockton approved an agreement with Marina Energy LLC for the installation of solar panels on The Big Blue athletic center roof to generate electricity. Marina Energy is a subsidiary of South Jersey Industries. Stockton paid nothing for the equipment and signed a 10-year agreement to buy the generated power. In 2009 the job was completed.

As part of the capital plan, Housing V was built in 2009 to accommodate the rising demand for student housing. It incorporates geothermal heating and cooling using closed-loop technology, for a total of 450 tons cooling capacity. To eliminate the possibility of groundwater contamination in the event of a leak, freeze protection is provided in the circulating fluid. The design accommodates future solar thermal heating systems. Sustainable design includes landscaping: upper-story deciduous trees were planted along the south-facing facades of the residence halls to provide shade during the summer months, but allow the warmth of the sun to reach the buildings during the winter. This design received the "Green Project of Distinction" award from Education Design Showcase.

Stockton's next green project was the largest single building project in its history. Designed and built according to the U.S. Green Building Council's LEED Gold Standard in sustainable design, the new Campus Center, completed in 2011, provides  of space for dining, bookstore, pool, theater, lounges and offices.

It will use 25% less energy than standard construction, and 40% less water. Other features include low-emitting adhesives, sealants, paints and coatings. Additional "green" features of the building include a storm water-collection system to irrigate an on-site "rain garden" landscaped with indigenous and adapted plant species. It also has a sophisticated energy management system for heating, cooling, ventilation and lighting.

In 2013, Stockton received approval from the New Jersey Pinelands Commission to administer the state's first comprehensive forest management plan on public land. Stockton actively manages more than 1,500 acres of forest on its campus, benefiting the local wildlife populations, protecting the campus against fire and pathogens and providing recreation such as hiking and wildlife viewing.

Athletics

Team mascot is the Osprey
 Intercollegiate Sports Include: Men's and Women's Cross Country, Field Hockey, Men's and Women's Soccer, Women's Tennis, Women's Volleyball, Men's and Women's Basketball, Men's and Women's Indoor Track & Field, Baseball, Men's and Women's Lacrosse, Women's Rowing, Softball, Women's Golf, and Men's and Women's Outdoor Track & Field.
The team is part of the NJAC in the majority of sports. In men's lacrosse they compete in the Coastal Lacrosse Conference.
 Intramural Sports Include: Flag Football, Indoor Soccer, Volleyball, Dodgeball, Basketball, Street Hockey, and Softball.
 Club Sports Include: Bowling, Ice Hockey, Jiu Jitsu, Judo, Table Tennis, Fishing, Men's Rowing, Ultimate Frisbee, Fencing, Men's Volleyball, Co-Ed Weight Training, Quidditch, Golf, Scuba Diving, Co-Ed Tennis, and Esports.
 Stockton also offers a cheerleading squad open to both male and female students. The squad traditionally performs at all home men's and women's basketball games.

Honors
 Paul Lewis was the NCAA Division III 400-Meter Dash Champion in 1981

2001, NCAA Division III Men's Soccer Champions. Coach Jeff Haines was named NCAA Division III "Coach of the Year."
 2003, Stockton student Kim Marino was NCAA Division III Indoor and Outdoor Track and Field Women's Pole Vault Champion and record holder.
 Nine NCAA individual national champions in track & field
 Men's basketball coach Gerry Matthews is the winningest college basketball coach in New Jersey history. Matthews retired from Stockton University before the start of the 2016–2017 season. The basketball court was named "Gerry Matthews Court" in his honor.
 Two Olympic medalists held the position of athletic director at Stockton: Don Bragg (1960 pole vault gold) and G. Larry James (1968 4x400 relay gold and 400-meters silver).
 Paul Klemic was the NCAA Division III Men's Long Jump Champion in 2005 and 2006.
 Tiffany Masuhr was the NCAA Division III Women's Javelin Champion in 2005.
 Men's Basketball advanced to the NCAA Final Four in 1987 and 2009.
 Women's Soccer advanced to and hosted the NCAA Final Four in 1995.
 Men's Soccer advanced to the NCAA Final Four in 1999 and the Elite Eight in 2004.
Jared Lewis was the NCAA Division III Triple Jump Champion in 2017 and 2018.

Arts 
The Stockton Performing Arts Center  offers musical and theater performances for the community,serves as a venue for student productions and performances through the School of Arts and Humanities, and hosts other campus events.

Stockton has had a campus Art Gallery since 1973. Initially located in a classroom-sized space and relocated in 1979 to a former dance studio, the Art Gallery opened in a dedicated exhibition space in January 2012. The Art Gallery is a dramatic two-level space with an open central well that visually connects the two floors. The creative conversion and re-design of the gallery and L-Wing was completed by the architectural firm PS&S (Paulus, Sokolowski & Sartor). The Art Gallery exhibits the work of graduating art majors every year in addition to art by local, regional, and nationally known artists.

In 2010, Stockton College entered a partnership with the South Jersey fine arts center Noyes Museum wherein Stockton would supply funds for needed repairs, and Noyes would provide access to their collections to Stockton.  The partnership grew, and eventually the Noyes Foundation which ran the museum entirely ceded its assets and control of the museum to Stockton from 2016–2017. The original Absecon site was sold and the museum currently has exhibits at Stockton's Kramer Hall in Hammonton, as well as the Noyes Arts Garage in Atlantic City.

Notable people

Faculty and staff
 Stephen Dunn, Distinguished Professor Emeritus of Creative Writing, received the 2001 Pulitzer Prize for Poetry for his collection of poems, Different Hours.
 University President Vera King Farris spoke at the Stockholm International Forum on the Holocaust in 1999, hosted by the Prime Minister of Sweden and attended by 44 national heads of state.
 Larry James (1947–2008), gold medalist at the 1968 Summer Olympics, was athletic director at Stockton for 28 years. In 2007, Stockton's track and soccer facility was named "G. Larry James Stadium" in his honor.
 Dr. Janice Joseph, Distinguished Professor of Criminal Justice, serves on the executive board of the International Scientific and Professional Advisory Council (ISPAC) of the United Nations Crime Prevention and Criminal Justice Program, a UN Institute held in Milan, Italy
 Dr. William C. Lubenow, a Fellow of the Royal Historical Society, author and historian, serves as president of the North American Conference on British Studies. Among his many published works are: The Cambridge Apostles, 1820–1914: Liberalism, Imagination, and Friendship in British Intellectual and Professional Life.  Cambridge University Press, 1998
 Dr. Carol Rittner, Sisters of Mercy RSM, a Distinguished Professor of Holocaust & Genocide Studies, and considered one of the 50 greatest scholars on the Holocaust. She co-produced the Academy Award-nominated film The Courage to Care based on her book of the same name, and has authored or edited over 15 books. Dr. Rittner spoke at the United Nations twice in 2014, on issues involving genocide in Rwanda and the Holocaust.
 Dr. Patricia Reid-Merritt, Distinguished Professor of Social Work and Africana Studies, is a nationally recognized author and scholar of Africana Studies who chaired the committee to place a statue of civil rights activist Fannie Lou Hamer in Ruleville, Mississippi.
 Dr. Stewart Farrell is founder and director of Stockton's Coastal Research Center, a nationally known organization that works on coastal zone management issues federal, state and municipal governments.
 The Rev. Dr. Demetrios J. Constantelos, Distinguished Professor Emeritus of History and Religious Studies and a retired priest of the Greek Orthodox Church, was an expert on the social and religious history and civilization of the Byzantine Empire. He authored 15 books and edited 10 more. The Constantelos Hellenic Collection and Reading Room, opened in September 2014, houses 3,000 rare and important works from his collection on campus.
 Distinguished Professor of Art Wendel A. White was awarded a Guggenheim Fellowship in 2003 for his exceptional creativity in photography.
 Dr. David Lester, a Distinguished Professor of Psychology, is one of the world's leading suicidologists. He is a scholar and author adept in many academic disciplines, with over 2,300 publications worldwide.

Alumni

Aimee Belgard (born 1974), is an American lawyer and politician who serves as a judge in New Jersey Superior Court
Kevin M. Cathcart (Class of 1975), former executive director of Lambda Legal (1992-2016), considered the 'dean' of LGBT leaders, as the longest serving head of a major national LGBT nonprofit.  He led the strategy to finally eliminate state anti-sodomy laws that criminalized sexual relations between consenting adults of the same sex, leading to the 2003 Supreme Court victory in Lawrence v. Texas.
 Christopher J. Connors (born 1956), member of the New Jersey Senate
 Bob Crawford (born 1971), founding member and bassist for the Grammy-nominated band The Avett Brothers.
 Matthew Pratt Guterl (born 1971), historian, is Professor of Africana Studies and American Studies at Brown University and is an author
 Laurel Hester (1956–2006), a New Jersey police lieutenant who rose to national attention with her successful deathbed appeal for the extension of pension benefits to her domestic partner. Her battle was shown in Freeheld (2007), the winner of the Academy Award for Best Short Documentary, and the feature film of the same name (2015), in which Hester was portrayed by Julianne Moore.
 Harvey Kesselman (born 1951), fifth president of Stockton University, inaugurated in 2016. He is the first Stockton alumnus to become president and was a member of the first class at Stockton. Kesselman was among those students affectionately referred to as the "Mayflower" students, because the first classes in 1971 were held at the Mayflower Hotel, located on the Atlantic City boardwalk, while construction was being completed on the first academic buildings on the main campus in Galloway.
 Bruce Larkin (born 1957), children's book author
Frederick John LaVergne, was a 2018 Democratic candidate who sought election to the U.S. House to represent the 3rd Congressional District of New Jersey.
 Katrina Law (born 1985), actress, Spartacus: Vengeance and Arrow
Marcus Major, is an American author. He is best known for writing novels pertaining to African-American love interests.
Tim Lenahan (born 1959), Head Men's Soccer Coach, Northwestern University
 Santiago Solari (born 1976), Argentine football (soccer) player

References

External links
 
 Official athletics website

 
1969 establishments in New Jersey
Educational institutions established in 1969
Galloway Township, New Jersey
Universities and colleges in Atlantic County, New Jersey
Public universities and colleges in New Jersey